Lanaro is a surname. Notable people with this surname include:

 Dino Lanaro (1909–1998), Italian painter
 Germán Lanaro (born 1986), Argentinian football player
 Giovanni Lanaro (born 1981), Mexican pole vaulter
 Gustavo Lanaro (born 1986), Argentinian football player
 Romina Lanaro (born 1986), Argentinian fashion model